Yarukvalar is a rural locality (a selo) in Oruzhbinsky Selsoviet, Magaramkentsky District, Republic of Dagestan, Russia. The population was 433 as of 2010. There are 14 streets.

Geography 
Yarukvalar is located 156 km southeast of Makhachkala, on the right bank of the Gyulgerychay River. Darkush-Kazmalyar and Kartas-Kazmalyar are the nearest rural localities.

Nationalities 
Lezgins live there.

References 

Rural localities in Magaramkentsky District